Dream Empress (foaled March 22, 2006 in Kentucky) is an American Thoroughbred racehorse who won the 2008 Alcibiades Stakes .

Career

Dream Empress' first race was on July 17, 2008 at Ellis Park Race Course, where she finished 4th. Her second race at Saratoga Race Course on August 22, 2008, got her the first win of her career.

On October 3, 2008, she won the biggest race of her career at the Grade I Alcibiades Stakes. This proved to be the last win of her career.

She continued to compete through 2008, 2009 and 2010 with her final race being on February 14, 2010 at the Grade II La Cañada Stakes, where she finished 6th. She was then sold to Big Red Farm, LLC in January 2018.

Pedigree

References

2006 racehorse births
Racehorses bred in Kentucky
Racehorses trained in the United States
Thoroughbred family 4-r